The Lane Steam Car was produced in Poughkeepsie, New York, from 1900 to 1911.

History 
The Lane brothers; William, George and John built their first steam runabout for personal use in 1900. By the end of that year, they built five more and became a long term veteran and brass era producer of steam cars.

Incorporated as the Lane Motor Vehicle Company, the 1900 Model No. 1, was a 4 passenger runabout with a 2-cylinder steam engine under the body. In 1905 a touring body with the boiler under a front hood would be offered. The Model 75 Touring of 1907 was a 30hp compound engine steam car priced at $2,500 to $3,400, .  Production in 1908 was 89 cars and was almost 150 in 1909.   

Steam powered cars sales were slowing in favor of gasoline powered cars.  Lane produced a final 63 steam cars in 1911.

See also 

 Lane Motor Vehicle Co at the Virtual Steam Car Museum
 Two Lane Steam Cars were extant in 2022, a 1901 Runabout and a 1909 Model 15 Tourer
 Lane Model 15 at PreWarCar

References 

Defunct motor vehicle manufacturers of the United States
Veteran vehicles
Brass Era vehicles
Steam cars
1900s cars
1910s cars
Motor vehicle manufacturers based in New York (state)
Vehicle manufacturing companies established in 1900
Vehicle manufacturing companies disestablished in 1911
Cars introduced in 1900